Watford Football Club is an English football club from Watford, Hertfordshire. They played in the 2013–14 Football League Championship, for the seventh consecutive season since relegation from the Premier League in 2006–07. The manager was Giuseppe Sannino.

Background
Gianfranco Zola replaced Sean Dyche as Watford manager at the end of the 2011–12 season following Sean Dyche's dismissal. Following the takeover of Watford by the Pozzo family, Watford loaned a significant number of players on season-long deals from fellow Pozzo-owned clubs Udinese and Granada. The use of a large number of loan players drew criticism from fellow managers, who argued that a large number of loan players from a few clubs should not be allowed. However, despite the number of loanees at the club, Watford used the second-most academy players after Middlesbrough, using eight different academy players throughout the season.

Pre-season
Watford attended a pre-season training camp in northern Italy and played friendly fixtures before playing more fixtures in the UK

Football League Championship

Football League Cup

FA Cup

League table

Summary

Players

Statistics

No. = Squad number

Pos = Playing position

P = Number of games played

G = Number of goals scored

 = Yellow cards

GK = Goalkeeper

DF = Defender

MF = Midfielder

FW = Forward

 = Red cards

Yth = Whether player went through Watford's youth system

Joined club = Year that player became a Watford first team player

Age = Current age

 Loan player

Statistics correct as of game played 3 May 2014. 
Numbers in brackets indicate substitute appearances

Transfers
updates as 20 September 2013

In

Out
At the end of the 2012–13 season, the club announced that seven players would be released at the end of their contracts, alongside Chris Iwelumo, who had already agreed to join Scunthorpe United. After being released by the club, Jack Bonham signed for Brentford, Stephen McGinn signed for Sheffield United and Mark Yeates signed for Bradford City.

Loans
updates as 20 September 2013

In

Out

International
On 14 August 2013, Cristian Battocchio made his Italian Under-21 debut in a 4–1 friendly win over Slovakia.

Coaching staff

References

Watford F.C. seasons
Watford F.C.